Vanguard (foaled 1835) was a steeplechase racehorse. At age eight, he defeated fifteen rivals to win the Grand National at his first attempt. This win gave jockey Tom Olliver his second consecutive victory after winning with Gaylad in 1842. Vanguard became such a favourite of Olliver's that when he died, Olliver ordered that Vanguard's hide be used to make a sofa, which is today in the ownership of Aintree.

Grand National record

1835 racehorse births
National Hunt racehorses
Non-Thoroughbred racehorses
Racehorses trained in the United Kingdom
Racehorses bred in the United Kingdom
Grand National winners